Sponskaftet Spur is a spur extending west from The Altar, in the Humboldt Mountains of Queen Maud Land. Discovered and mapped from air photos by the German Antarctic Expedition, 1938–39. Remapped by Norway from air photos and surveys by Norwegian Antarctic Expedition, 1956–60, and named Sponskaftet (the wooden spoon handle).

References

Ridges of Queen Maud Land
Humboldt Mountains (Antarctica)